Haaren High School was an American high school located in Midtown Manhattan, New York. The school was noted for its vocational program including classes focusing on internal combustion engines. The facility was constructed in 1903 to house DeWitt Clinton High School. When that school relocated in 1927, it became home to Haaren High School (named for educator John Henry Haaren) until that school closed in the late 1970s.  After developers announced plans to renovate the building to house offices, production studios and retail, John Jay College purchased the structure in 1988 and remodeled it to house offices, a library, classrooms and other facilities.

Notable alumni
Herman Badillo (1929–2014), first Puerto Rican-American U.S. congressman
Mario Biaggi (1917–2015), decorated policeman and US Congressman
Edd Byrnes, actor
Ron Carey (1936–2008), president of the International Brotherhood of Teamsters
Ed Feingersh, 1950s photojournalist
Padraic Fiacc, Irish poet
Robert García, New York Assemblyman and congressman
David Greenglass, 1950s Soviet spy
Joe Hayes, Taekwondo fighter and champion
Lynbert Johnson, NBA player
Robert Mitchum (1917–1997), actor
Pedro Pietri, Nuyorican poet
Paul Rand, graphic designer and illustrator
Albert Salmi, actor
 Ray Santos (1928-2019), Grammy Award-winning Latin musician.
George Stade, novelist and Columbia literature professor. 
James Victor, actor
John Worth, President and Executive Director of the Academy of Model Aeronautics

References 

Defunct high schools in Manhattan
Educational institutions in the United States with year of establishment missing
Former school buildings in the United States
School buildings completed in 1903
Public high schools in Manhattan
John Jay College of Criminal Justice
 
59th Street (Manhattan)
1903 establishments in New York City